Discinoidea is a superfamily of Discinid brachiopods.  For discussion of Discinid taxonomy, see Discinidae.

References

Animal superfamilies
Discinida